The 2011 Oceania Sevens Championship was the fourth Oceania Sevens in men's rugby sevens. It was held at Apia Park in Samoa.

Samoa won the Oceania Sevens Championship by defeating Fiji 19 to 7. Tonga, Papua New Guinea, and Niue, as the three highest finishers excluding core teams Australia, Fiji, and Samoa, qualified for Gold Coast legs of the 2011–12 IRB Sevens World Series. Tonga also qualified for the 2012 Hong Kong Sevens.

Pool stage

Pool A

Pool B

Knockout stage

Bowl

Plate

Cup

References

2011
2011 in Samoan rugby union
2011 rugby sevens competitions
2011 in Oceanian rugby union
International rugby union competitions hosted by Samoa